Sven Alfred Thofelt (19 May 1904 – 1 February 1993) was a Swedish modern pentathlete and épée fencer who competed at the 1928, 1932, 1936 and 1948 Summer Olympics.

Career
In the modern pentathlon, Thofelt won the gold medal in the 1928 Olympics and finished fourth in 1932 and 1936, competing in 1932 with broken ribs and injured arm due to a bad fall from the horse. In fencing, he won two team medals in 1936 and 1948, finishing ninth individually in 1932. He also won four bronze and two silver medals in the team épée at the world championships of 1931–1947.

Nationally Thofelt won six titles in the modern pentathlon, three in the individual épée, and one in the 4 × 100 m freestyle swimming.

Thofelt was a career officer, graduating from the Royal Military Academy in 1924 and retiring in 1964 in the rank of brigadier-general. He was an adjutant of the Crown Prince Gustaf Adolf (1938–47) and King Gustav V (1948–50). In parallel he served as a sports administrator. In 1948 he became secretary-general of the Union Internationale de Pentathlon Moderne, and in 1960–1988 served as its president. He was also president of the Swedish Fencing Federation (1968) and of the executive board of the Swedish Olympic Committee (1969–76). Between 1970 and 1976 Thofelt was an IOC member and later an IOC honorary member.

Thofelt was the Swedish team leader at the 1956 Summer Olympics, where his son Björn competed in the modern pentathlon. Björn previously won the world title in 1954.

See also
 Dual sport and multi-sport Olympians

References

External links
 
 

1904 births
1993 deaths
Swedish male modern pentathletes
Swedish male épée fencers
Olympic modern pentathletes of Sweden
Olympic fencers of Sweden
Modern pentathletes at the 1928 Summer Olympics
Modern pentathletes at the 1932 Summer Olympics
Modern pentathletes at the 1936 Summer Olympics
Fencers at the 1932 Summer Olympics
Fencers at the 1936 Summer Olympics
Fencers at the 1948 Summer Olympics
Olympic gold medalists for Sweden
Olympic silver medalists for Sweden
Olympic bronze medalists for Sweden
Olympic medalists in fencing
Olympic medalists in modern pentathlon
Sportspeople from Stockholm
Medalists at the 1928 Summer Olympics
Medalists at the 1936 Summer Olympics
Medalists at the 1948 Summer Olympics